The Chinitna Formation is a geologic formation in Alaska. It preserves fossils dating back to the Jurassic period.

See also

 List of fossiliferous stratigraphic units in Alaska
 Paleontology in Alaska

References
 

Jurassic Alaska
Jurassic System of North America
Bathonian Stage